The widow skimmer (Libellula luctuosa) is one of the group of dragonflies known as king skimmers. The nymphs live in the water, molting and growing until they are ready to emerge from the water and then molting a final time to reveal their wings.

Anatomy and morphology 

Widow skimmers have large bulky bodies, with large heads. Adults have a steely blue body area but juveniles are yellow with brown stripes. Eyes are also large and close together meeting in the middle of the head. They have three pairs of legs. Legs are black in color. They have two pairs of wings: forewings and hindwings. Wings of both sexes are marked with prominent black basal bands. They keep their wings extended over their bodies. Adult males develop broad white spots at midwing as they mature. The abdomen measures 24–32 mm.  They also have a slight white hue on their abdomen and thorax.

Distribution 

This species can be found commonly across the United States (except in the higher Rocky Mountains areas) and in southern Ontario and Quebec.

Habitat 

This species is found commonly in muddy substrates, or still bodies of waters such as ponds, lakes, streams, and creeks.

Behavior 

They are predators that prey on other insects such as mosquitoes. They catch their prey using their legs and use their fangs to bring prey into their mouth.

The process of reproduction is known as "in tandem." Position themselves to form a wheel or heart shape before sperm is transferred.

References

External links

University of Puget Sound
University of Wisconsin
 

Libellulidae
Odonata of North America
Insects of Canada
Insects described in 1839